Jeremy Robinson (born October 22, 1974), also known as Jeremy Bishop, Jeremiah Knight, and other pen names, is an author of sixty novels and novellas. He is known for mixing elements of science, history, and mythology. Many of his novels have been adapted into comic books, optioned for film and TV, and translated into thirteen languages. He is the author of the Nemesis Saga, the Chess Team series, and the non-fiction title, The Screenplay Workbook (2003, Lone Eagle Press).

Personal life

Robinson was born in Beverly, Massachusetts, where he lived until he was 20. He resides in New Hampshire with his wife and three children, where he works as a full-time writer.

Robinson is an gamer and his experiences while gaming with a group of friends formed the basis for his 2018 novel Space Force, which is loosely based on the Battle Royale game format and features many tropes from that genre.

Career 
Robinson's career as a writer started out in comic books with several stints on indie comics. After that he wrote screenplays, several of which were produced, optioned or in development (including the screenplay version of The Didymus Contingency). His switch to book writing came with The Screenplay Workbook in 2003. He has since written over sixty novels, which are available in twelve languages, including the Nemesis Saga and the Chess Team series published by Thomas Dunne Books, an imprint of St. Martin's Press. Robinson is a former Director of New Hampshire AuthorFest, a non-profit organization promoting literacy in New Hampshire.

Bibliography

Origins books 
"Origins" refers to the first five novels written by Jeremy Robinson.

The Didymus Contingency (2005, Self-Published) First self-published novel.
Raising the Past (2006, Self-Published) Second self-published novel.
Antarktos Rising (2007, Breakneck Books) Narrative expanded into the Antarktos Saga.
Kronos (2009, Variance Publishing) First Kaiju thriller.
Beneath (2010, Breakneck Media) First work published under Breakneck Media.

Antarktos Saga
The Antarktos Saga is an expansion of Antarktos Rising and is set on the book's tropical paradise version of Antarctica after the continent's thawing.

The Last Hunter primarily revolves around Solomon Ull Vincent ("Solomon" after Robinson's son, "Ull" after the Norse god Ullr), the first child born on the continent, kidnapped and mentored by a fictional version of Antarctic explorer Belgrave Edward Sutton Ninnis as a hunter for the Nephilim residing in subterranean Antarctica. The Collected Edition contains the short story "The Children of Antarktos", where an adult Solomon and his wife raise two daughters in the aftermath of the series.

The Last Hunter – Descent (2011, Breakneck Media)
The Last Hunter – Pursuit (2011, Breakneck Media)
The Last Hunter – Ascent (2011, Breakneck Media)
The Last Hunter – Lament (2012, Breakneck Media)
The Last Hunter – Onslaught (2012, Breakneck Media)
Robinson also co-wrote a follow-up companion novella, which centers around Norah Kainda Vincent, Solomon's younger daughter, who sets out to save her older sister Aquila.
The Last Valkyrie (2017, Breakneck Media) Written with Tori Paquette.

Jack Sigler / Chess Team 
The Jack Sigler / Chess Team series follows the adventures of a group of military operators founded to combat mysterious and mythical threats to the world.

Prime (July 2012, Breakneck Media) [Book 0] Written with Sean Ellis.
Pulse (2009, Thomas Dunne Books)
Instinct (2010, Thomas Dunne Books)
Threshold (2011, Thomas Dunne Books)
Chesspocalypse Novellas (occurs between Threshold and Ragnarok)
Callsign: King (2011, Breakneck Media) Follows Jack Sigler. Written with Sean Ellis.
Callsign: Queen (2011, Breakneck Media) This one follows Zelda Baker. Written with David Wood.
Callsign: Rook (2011, Breakneck Media) This one follows Stan Tremblay. Written with Edward G. Talbot.
Callsign: King-Book II: Underworld (2011, Breakneck Media) This one back to following Jack Sigler. Written with Sean Ellis.
Callsign: Bishop (2011, Breakneck Media) This one follows Erik Somers. Written with David McAfee.
Callsign: Knight (2011, Breakneck Media) This one follows Shin Dae Jung. Written with Ethan Cross.
Callsign: Deep Blue (2011, Breakneck Media) This one follows Tom Duncan. Written with Kane Gilmour.
Callsign: King-Book III: Blackout (2012, Breakneck Media) Written with Sean Ellis.
Ragnarok (October 2012, Seven Realms Publishing) Written with Kane Gilmour.
Omega (October 2013, Seven Realms Publishing) Written with Kane Gilmour.
Continuum Novellas (occurs between Omega and Savage)
Guardian (2014, Breakneck Media) Written with J. Kent Holloway
Patriot (2015, Breakneck Media) Written with J. Kent Holloway
Centurion (August 2016, Breakneck Media) Written with J. Kent Holloway
Savage (July 2014) Written with Sean Ellis.
Cannibal (February 2015) Written with Sean Ellis.
Empire (April 2016, Breakneck Media) Written with Sean Ellis

Refuge 
The Refuge series revolves around the eponymous fictional small town in New Hampshire as a group of residents is caught in a rapture-like phenomenon that transports the town through a unique transdimensional journey each entry, deliberately serialized according to the style of a seasonal TV show format.

Refuge: Night of the Blood Sky (2013, Breakneck Media)
Refuge: Darkness Falls (2013, Breakneck Media) Written with Daniel S. Boucher.
Refuge: Lost in the Echo (2013, Breakneck Media) Written with Robert Swartwood.
Refuge: Ashes And Dust (2013, Breakneck Media) Written with David McAfee.
Refuge: Bonfires Burning Bright (2014, Breakneck Media) Written with Kane Gilmour.

Nemesis Saga 
The Nemesis Saga follows the fictional Homeland Security's fictional Fusion Center-P (Paranormal) and their exploits with the ancient Goddess of Vengeance, the massive Kaiju Nemesis.

Island 731 (March 2013, Thomas Dunne Books) [Book 0]
Project Nemesis (December 2012, Breakneck Media)
Project Maigo (November 2013, Breakneck Media)
Project 731 (November 2014, Breakneck Media)
Project Hyperion (September 2015, Breakneck Media)
Project Legion (October 2016, Breakneck Media)

Infinite Timeline
The Infinite Timeline is a hybrid book series, literary cycle and shared fictional universe written by Robinson and distributed by Breakneck Media. The cycle began in May 2017 and will conclude in March 2023 with thirteen novels. Robinson began writing these novels as stand-alone stories that could co-exist in an ecosystem similar to the Marvel Cinematic Universe's formula, combining science fiction, fantasy, horror and thriller with twisted concepts based on several mythologies. There are nine solo novels followed by four crossover events in this series.
Infinite (May 2017, Breakneck Media)
The Others (July 2018, Breakneck Media)
Flux (May 2019, Breakneck Media)
Tribe (November 2019, Breakneck Media)
NPC (June 2020, Breakneck Media)
Exo-Hunter (December 2020, Breakneck Media)
The Dark (July 2021, Breakneck Media)
Mind Bullet (November 2021, Breakneck Media)
Torment (December 2021, Breakneck Media)
Infinite2 (March 2022, Breakneck Media)
The Order (April 2022, Breakneck Media)
Khaos (October 2022, Breakneck Media)
Singularity (March 2023, Breakneck Media)

Stand-alone novels 
The Sentinel (2011, 47 North)
The Raven (2011, 47 North)
Xom-B (2014, Thomas Dunne Books)
Flood Rising (2014, Breakneck Media)
MirrorWorld (2015, St. Martin's Press)
Apocalypse Machine (2016, Breakneck Media)
Unity (2016, Breakneck Media)
The Distance (2016, Breakneck Media)
Forbidden Island (2017, Breakneck Media)
The Divide (2018, Breakneck Media)
Space Force (2018, Breakneck Media)
Alter (2018, Breakneck Media)
Tether (2019, Breakneck Media)

Graphic Novels & Comics

Nemesis Saga 
Between 2015 and 2016, American Gothic Press and IDW Publishing published a series of comics based on the Nemesis Saga and Island 731

Godzilla Rage Across Time

Audiobooks

Robinson has released over 60 audiobooks of his work on Audible performed by celebrated voice actors like Jeffrey Kafer, R. C. Bray and Luke Daniels.

Non-fiction

Screenplay Workbook: The Writing Before the Writing (2003, Lone Eagle Press) Written with Tom Mungoven

Short stories

Insomnia 
Insomnia is a short story collection that includes the following tales:

"Harden's Tree" (2005, AlienSkin Magazine; 2006, Download Tales)
 "Counting Sheep" (2005, AlienSkin Magazine)
 "Insomnia"
 "The Eater"
 "Star Crossed Killers"
 "Hearing Aid"
 "Dark Seed of the Moon"
 "Bought and Paid For": a character sketch for Scott Sigler's novel The Crypt

Dimensions Magazine 
 "From Above" (2005, Dimensions Magazine; 2006, Download Tales)

Film & Television 
As of 2015, the Chess Team novels, starting with Pulse, are in development as a feature film series with Emmy Award-winning director Jabbar Raisani.
On May 6th 2022, It was announced that a new TV series is in development based on the Project Nemesis novels. 
Project Nemesis the TV Series

Articles
 "The Difference Between Science Fiction and Fantasy – What Every Screenwriter Needs to Know Before Writing the Next Matrix or Lord of the Rings" (2003, Script Magazine)
 "Interview with Jeremy Robinson" (2001, Red Moon Chronicles)

References

External links
BewareOfMonsters.com – Jeremy Robinson's Website
Jeremy Robinson's Homepage 
 Publishers Weekly Review

1974 births
Living people
21st-century American novelists
American thriller writers
Techno-thriller writers
American science fiction writers
American adventure novelists
American male novelists
21st-century American male writers
Screenwriting instructors
21st-century American screenwriters